Ottilien may refer to:
Previous name of Ramu, a river in northern Papua New Guinea
the Ottilien Congregation, a congregation of religious houses within the Benedictine Confederation
the St. Ottilien Archabbey